The Scientific Society of Aligarh was a literary society founded by Sir Syed Ahmad Khan at Aligarh, India. The main objectives of the society were to translate Western works on arts and science into vernacular languages and promote western education among the masses.

History
On 9 January 1864 Sir Syed formed a translation society called Scientific Society at Ghazipur with the goal of translating scientific books of English and other European languages into Urdu and Hindi. The first meeting was held in January 1864 under the president ship of Mr. A. B. Spate, the then Collector of Ghazipur. This society was moved in April 1864 to Aligarh and henceforth also known as the Scientific Society of Aligarh. The society sought to promote liberal, modern education and Western scientific knowledge in the Muslim community in India. The society was modelled after the Royal Society and the Royal Asiatic Society. Sir Syed assembled Muslim scholars from different parts of the country and the society held annual conferences, disbursed funds for educational causes and regularly published a journal on scientific subjects in English and Urdu.

Many of the essays he wrote during this time were on topics like the solar system, plant and animal life, human evolution, etc. In many ways, Sir Syed tried to bridge the gap between religion and science.

Members
Jai Kishan Das, close Hindu associate of Sir Syed served as its secretary from 1867 till 1874. He was also nominated as Co-President of The Society for life. Other active members of the society included Nawab Mohsin-ul-Mulk, Nawab Abdul Latif, Zakaullah Dehlvi, Nazir Ahmad Dehlvi, and Kunwar Luft Ali Khan of Chhattari. The society also appointed two translators; Babu Ganga Prasad was an English translator and Moulvi Faiyazul Hasan was the vernacular translator.

Institute
The Aligarh Scientific Society had a library and a reading room of its own. The books were mainly donated to the Society by different Indian as well as foreign gentlemen.

Sir  Syed  himself  donated  a  large  number  of  books  to  the  library.  The  Society subscribed to forty-four journals and magazines in 1866. Of those, 18 were in English and  rest  in  Urdu,  Persian,  Arabic  and  Sanskrit.  It  exchanged  its  publication  with similar  societies  like  the  Society  for  the  Diffusion  of  Useful  Knowledge  founded  by Pandit  Harsokh  Rai  at  Lahore  and  the  Mohammedan Literary Society founded  by Nawab Abdul Latif at  Calcutta.  It  also  exchanged  its  journal  with  the publications of the Bengal Asiatic Society, Calcutta.

Publications
Aligarh Institute Gazette was the journal of the society. It was the first bilingual journal of India.

References

External links
 

Scientific societies based in India
History of science and technology in India
1864 establishments in India
Aligarh Movement
Scientific organizations established in 1864